Jonathan Musgrave is a British orienteering competitor.

He received a silver medal in relay at the 1993 World Orienteering Championships in West Point, together with Martin Bagness, Stephen Palmer and Steven Hale, only 15 seconds behind the Swiss winning team. He finished 6th in the relay in 1995, and also 6th in 1997.

Musgrave won the British Orienteering Championships in 1995.

See also
 British orienteers
 List of orienteers
 List of orienteering events

References

Year of birth missing (living people)
Living people
British orienteers
Scottish orienteers
Male orienteers
Foot orienteers
World Orienteering Championships medalists